Trevor Robert Ward (born 18 January 1968) is a former English professional cricketer.  A right-handed batsman and an occasional off-spin bowler. Ward played county cricket for Kent and Leicestershire. He was born in Farningham in Kent.

Ward played his last county match for Leicestershire in 2003. Subsequently, he played Minor Counties cricket for Norfolk until 2013.

As a junior, Ward captained the England under-19 cricket team on one occasion.

References

1968 births
Living people
Kent cricketers
Leicestershire cricketers
Norfolk cricketers
English cricketers
People from Farningham